Ivo Battelli (12 March 1904 – 3 November 1994) was an Italian architect and set decorator. His work was part of the architecture event in the art competition at the 1932 Summer Olympics.

Selected filmography
 The Dream of Butterfly (1939)
 Manon Lescaut (1940)
 The Palace on the River (1940)
Beyond Love (1940)
 The Prisoner of Santa Cruz (1941)
 To Live in Peace (1947)
 Buried Alive (1949)
 The Two Sisters (1950)
 Redemption (1952)
 A Mother Returns (1952)
 The Song of the Heart (1955)
 Goodbye Naples (1955)

References

1904 births
1994 deaths
20th-century Italian architects
Olympic competitors in art competitions
People from São Paulo